Baoneng Shenyang Global Financial Center is an unfinished skyscraper Shenyang, Liaoning, China. Construction started in 2014 and is expected to be completed in 2020. However, as of July 2019 the construction is on hold.

The towers occupy a prestigious site to the south of the iconic Liaoning TV Tower, and form part of a master plan covering an area of 59 hectares along the famous "Golden Corridor" Youth Street in the central business district. The development overlooks Youth Park and the Nanyun River to the east. In addition to the two supertall towers, the complex will contain five luxury high-rise residential buildings, each rising approximately 200 meters above a podium that accommodates a large culturally-themed lifestyle shopping mall.

Design

The design of Global Financial Center Tower 1 represents an exercise in both simplicity and iconicity. At the ground level, the tower meets the street at the human scale, with conical extrusions that downplay its verticality near the entrance. These canopies recall the nomadic tent entrances of the Qing Dynasty. Rising upward, the tower widens slightly before it tapers, giving it an oblong appearance. For structural consideration in a high seismic zone, the tower shaft evolves from a square to a convex plan with corners carved out to further reduce the considerable bulk of the tower and to soften the scale contrast with the surrounding residential towers. At the top, an executive club is located within a giant "pearl" that measures 50 meters in diameter. The pearl is the jewel in the crown of this mixed-use development.

See also
List of tallest buildings in China

References

Buildings and structures under construction in China
Skyscrapers in Shenyang
2018 in China
Skyscraper office buildings in China